Jetmore USD 227, also known as Hodgeman County Public Schools, is a public unified school district headquartered in Jetmore, Kansas, United States.  The district includes the communities of Jetmore, Hanston, and nearby rural areas.

Schools
The school district operates the following schools:
 Jetmore Middle School/High School
 Jetmore Elementary School

History
In 2011, it absorbed the former Hanston USD 228, which had dissolved.

See also
 Kansas State Department of Education
 Kansas State High School Activities Association
 List of high schools in Kansas
 List of unified school districts in Kansas

References

External links
 

School districts in Kansas
Hodgeman County, Kansas